Russian Rebels, 1600–1800, is a 1972 history book by Paul Avrich about four popular rebellions in early modern Russia (1606 Bolotnikov rebellion, 1670 Razin rebellion, 1707 Bulavin Rebellion, 1773 Pugachev's Rebellion) and their relation to the 1905 and 1917 Russian revolutions.

References

External links 

 

1972 non-fiction books
American history books
Books by Paul Avrich
English-language books
History books about the Russian Empire
W. W. Norton & Company books
History books about the Tsardom of Russia